Gustavo Díaz-Jerez (27 February 1970, Tenerife) is a Spanish pianist and composer.

Biography
Gustavo Díaz-Jerez studied piano with J. A. Rodriguez at the Conservatorio Superior of Santa Cruz de Tenerife, and subsequently with Solomon Mikowsky at Manhattan School of Music in New York City. He has performed extensively throughout Europe, Asia, South America, the UK and the US. He has collaborated with conductors such as Ivan Fischer, Victor Pablo, Gunther Herbig, Adrian Leaper, José R. Encinar, etc., with orchestras such as the Budapest Festival Orchestra, as well as the major Spanish orchestras (Tenerife, Gran Canaria, Galicia, Nacional de Cataluña, Castilla y León, Sinfónica de Madrid). He has been invited to play at various international music festivals, including the Festival Internacional de Canarias, Festival de La Roque-d'Anthéron, Quincena Musical Donostiarra, Festival Internacional de Santander, among others.

He studied composition with Giampaolo Bracali and Ludmila Ulehla at Manhattan School of Music. His compositional language may be defined as “algorithmic spectralism”, merging elements of the spectralist movement (Grisey, Murail, Radulescu, etc.), in which timbre plays a fundamental role, with processes derived from mathematical disciplines such as cellular automata, L-systems, fractals, genetic algorithms, number theory, spectrum analysis, additive synthesis, psychoacoustics, etc. Needless to say, the use of the computer is indispensable, usually producing results in the form of electronic music. However, his main interest is not in electroacoustics, but to “transcribe” these results using traditional instruments. This requires a very careful and elaborate process of quantization of melodic, rhythmic and timbre elements, so it can be adequately performed by human players. These transformations, however, leave intact the essence of the original process. His works are currently published by Composers Edition. A programmer as well, he has written the PC freeware program FractMus, which explores fractal and generative processes for music composition. His articles on the subject have been published by specialized magazines such as Electronic Musician. and MIT's Leonardo Music Journal.

Since 2002, he is a professor of piano at the Centro Superior de Música del País Vasco, Musikene. He is also a member of the Real Academia Canaria de Bellas Artes.

An enthusiast of virtual reality, he has created the first YouTube channel for classical music exclusively in VR.

Selected works
Orchestral
Ricercare: D. Schostakovitch in Memoriam for viola d'amore and string orchestra
Ymarxa for orchestra
Aranfaybo for chamber orchestra
Havan, concerto for viola d'amore and chamber orchestra
Ayssuragan, symphonic poem for clarinet and orchestra

Chamber music
Trio for violin, cello and piano
Sidhe, for violin, viola, cello and piano four-hands
Sonata for violin and piano
Sonata for viola and piano (2003)
Partita for viola d'amore, piano, vibraphone, marimba and multi percussion
Ricercare: D. Schostakovitch in Memoriam for viola d'amore and piano
Dhyana for viola d'amore and piano
Akhkhazu for alto saxophone and piano
Plerion for trumpet and piano
Tiamat for violin, viola, cello, double bass, and piano
Three Pieces for clarinet and piano
Tephra for violin, viola, cello, and piano
Songs of Garajonay for voice and ensemble
Olokun for marimba duo

Solo instrumental
Gehenna for piano solo
Phase Space for viola d'amore
Nous for solo flute
Metaludios, Book I
Metaludios, Book II
Metaludios, Book III
Metaludios, Book IV
Metaludios, Book V

Vocal
Zenith, for violin, viola, cello, flute, harp and voice
Songs of Garajonay, for voice and piano
Nudo de luz, for voice sextet

Opera
La casa imaginaria

Personal life
He married Belinda Sánchez Mozo and their son is Pablo Díaz Sánchez.

References

External links
Personal website (in Spanish and English)
Fractal Music Press
FractMus website (in English)
Youtube channel

1970 births
Living people
Spanish classical pianists
Male classical pianists
Spanish composers
Spanish male composers
Manhattan School of Music alumni
Maria Canals International Music Competition prize-winners
People from Tenerife
21st-century classical pianists
21st-century male musicians